B. salicifolia may refer to:

 Baccharis salicifolia, a flowering shrub species native to the desert southwest of the United States and northern Mexico
 Boscia salicifolia, Oliv., 1868, a plant species in the genus Boscia

See also
 Salicifolia (disambiguation)